The 1st Infantry Division was a division of the People's Army of Vietnam (PAVN), first formed from PAVN units in 1965.

Vietnam War
The Division was formed on 20 December 1965 from the PAVN 32nd, 33rd, 66th and 320th Regiment was under the control of the PAVN B3 Front in the Central Highlands.

The Division's 33rd and 66th Regiments were engaged in the Battle of Ia Drang from 14-18 November 1965, losing 1070-1753 killed.

The Division was the target of Operation Paul Revere from 10 May to 1 August 1966, losing 546 killed and 68 captured.

The Division's 33rd Regiment and the Viet Cong 95B and 101C Regiments were the target of Operation Paul Revere IV from 20 October to 30 December 1966, losing an estimated 120 killed.

The Division and the 10th Division were the target of Operation Sam Houston from 12 February to 5 April 1967, losing 733 killed.

The Division was the target of Operation Francis Marion from 6 April to 11 October 1967, losing 1,530 killed.

The Division was engaged in the Battle of Dak To from 3 to 23 November 1967.

During the Tet Offensive of January/February 1968, the Division's 66th and 174th Regiments attacked Ben Het Camp, Tân Cảnh Base Camp and attempted to cut Highway 14 between Dak To and Kontum. The 174th Regiment's attack on Tân Cảnh took place on 30 January but by the end of the day they had been repelled for the loss of over 300 killed. On 8 February the 174th Regiment attacked Tân Cảnh again and were repulsed for the loss of 150 killed. The 32nd Regiment attempted to cut Highway 19 at Thanh An on 1 February, losing 275 soldiers in the attack. Allied forces located the Regiment's base camp on 5 February and killed a further 35 soldiers.

In August 1968 as part of the Phase III Offensive, the Division was tasked with seizing Duc Lap Camp and then threatening Buôn Ma Thuột. During the Battle of Duc Lap from 24 to 27 August the Division's 66th Regiment lost more than 700 killed.

In 1969 the Division, now comprising the 95C, 101C and 209th Regiments, was sent to the Mekong Delta area. 

During the Easter Offensive in southern Cambodia and the Mekong Delta the Division was the only full PAVN division engaged in the fighting. The Division suffered heavy losses in the fighting at Kompong Trach, Cambodia from 22 March to the end of April and then was unable to achieve its objectives in the Mekong Delta.

References

Infantry divisions of Vietnam
Divisions of the People's Army of Vietnam
Military units and formations established in 1965